Dominik Wydra (born 21 March 1994) is an Austrian professional footballer who plays as a midfielder for Raków Częstochowa.

International career
Wydra has represented various Austrian youth national teams, and was captain of the U21 Austrian team. He is of Polish descent, and in December 2016 declared he wanted to represent Poland internationally.

Career statistics

References

1994 births
Living people
Footballers from Vienna
Austrian footballers
Austria youth international footballers
Austria under-21 international footballers
Austrian people of Polish descent
Association football midfielders
Austrian Football Bundesliga players
2. Bundesliga players
Ekstraklasa players
SK Rapid Wien players
SC Paderborn 07 players
VfL Bochum players
FC Erzgebirge Aue players
Eintracht Braunschweig players
Raków Częstochowa players
Austrian expatriate footballers
Expatriate footballers in Poland
Austrian expatriate sportspeople in Poland